In constitutional law, advice is a formal and usually binding instruction given by one constitutional officer of state to another. Particularly in parliamentary systems of government, heads of state often act on the basis of advice issued by prime ministers or other government ministers. For example, in constitutional monarchies, the monarch usually appoints ministers of the Crown on the advice of their prime minister.

Among the most prominent forms of advice offered are, among other things:
 Advice to appoint and remove individual ministers.
 Advice to dissolve parliament.
 Advice to deliver formal statements, such as a speech from the throne.

In some states, the duty to accept advice is legally enforceable, having been created by a constitution or statute. For example, the Basic Law of Germany requires the president to appoint federal ministers on the advice of the chancellor. In others, especially under the Westminster system, advice may legally be rejected; for example, in several Commonwealth realms, the monarch is not legally obliged to accept the advice of his or her ministers. This lack of obligation forms part of the basis for the monarch's reserve powers. Nevertheless, the convention that the head of state accept ministerial advice is so strong that in ordinary circumstances, refusal to do so would almost certainly provoke a constitutional crisis. 

Although most advice is binding, in comparatively rare instances it is not. For example, many heads of state may choose not to follow advice on a dissolution of parliament where the government has lost the confidence of that body. In some cases, whether the advice is mandatory or truly just advisory depends on the context and authority of the person offering it. Hence the president of Ireland ordinarily is obliged to dissolve Dáil Éireann (Assembly of Ireland) when advised to do so by the taoiseach (prime minister). However, if a  taoiseach has (in the words of the Constitution of Ireland) "ceased to retain the support of a majority in Dáil Éireann" (i.e., lost the confidence of parliament) the president has the option of refusing to follow that advice, and thus force the taoiseach to resign.

See also
 Advice and consent
 King–Byng Affair
 Constitutional economics
 Constitutionalism
 Rule according to higher law

Notes

Constitutional law